The Akron Police Department is the primary municipal law enforcement agency for the city of Akron, Ohio, United States. The current Police Chief is Stephen L. Mylett. The department currently has 451 sworn employees.

Rank structure and insignia

See also

 List of law enforcement agencies in Ohio

References

External links
 Official Website

Municipal police departments of Ohio